Dejan Komljenović (born 24 May 1984 in Velenje) is a Slovenian footballer. He is an attacking midfielder who has a great passing range.

Career
Komljenović played for NK Rudar Velenje, NK Maribor, SC Ritzing and Kastoria, before moving to Bulgarian club Lokomotiv Plovdiv in 2009. He has since returned to Slovenia to play for NK Nafta Lendava.

References

Living people
1984 births
Slovenian footballers
Slovenian expatriate footballers
Association football midfielders
Expatriate footballers in Greece
Expatriate footballers in Bulgaria
NK Rudar Velenje players
NK Maribor players
PFC Lokomotiv Plovdiv players
Kastoria F.C. players
NK Varaždin players
First Professional Football League (Bulgaria) players
Croatian Football League players
Slovenian expatriate sportspeople in Greece
People from Velenje
Slovenian expatriate sportspeople in Bulgaria